Carlo Labia, C.R. (1624 – 29 November 1701) was a Roman Catholic prelate who served as Archbishop (Personal Title) of Adria (1677–1701) and Archbishop of Corfù (1659-1677).

Biography
Carlo Labia was born in Venice, Italy in 1624 and ordained a priest in the Congregation of Clerics Regular of the Divine Providence.
On 27 January 1659, he was appointed during the papacy of Pope Alexander VII as Archbishop of Corfù.
On 9 February 1659, he was consecrated bishop by Giulio Cesare Sacchetti, Cardinal-Bishop of Sabina, with Alessandro Sperelli, Bishop of Gubbio, and Gregorio Carducci, Bishop of Valva e Sulmona, serving as co-consecrators. On 13 September 1677, he was appointed during the papacy of Pope Innocent XI as Archbishop (Personal Title) of Adria. He served as Archbishop of Adria until his death on 29 November 1701.

References

External links and additional sources
 (for Chronology of Bishops) 
 (for Chronology of Bishops) 

17th-century Roman Catholic bishops in the Republic of Venice
18th-century Roman Catholic bishops in the Republic of Venice
Bishops appointed by Pope Alexander VII
Bishops appointed by Pope Innocent XI
1624 births
1701 deaths
Theatine bishops